Wipperfeld is a village and a district in the town of Wipperfürth which is a Northrhine-Westphalian municipality in the Oberbergischer Kreis, about 40 km north-east of Cologne.

Geographical position
Wipperfeld is set in the west of Wipperfürth, next to the federal road B506 from Wipperfürth to Bergisch Gladbach.

Villages proximate to Wipperfeld are Lamsfuß, Erlen, Grüterich, Überberg and Oberholl.

The river "Wipperfelder Bach" runs through the village.

The district Wipperfeld 
The district Wipperfeld consists of the following villages:

History

Mediaeval Times
In mediaeval times the village formed a part of the department of Steinbach (Lindlar) and belonged to the district of the country court in Lindlar.

The parish church of Wipperfeld was built in the 12th century. The present-day church was built in 1892 and consecrated in 1894.

Modern Times 
Up unto the 19th century a flour mill was in operation. The mill is identified in the "Statistik des Bergischen Landes von 1797".

In 1890 Mr Mausbach from Wipperfeld was elected as the mayor of Lindlar.

Up to 1975 an independent municipality of Wipperfeld existed.

Culture

Parish Churches 
Catholic church of St. Klemens. Wipperfeld

Schools
 Catholic elementary school Wipperfeld

Traffic

Federal roads 

The federal road B506 from Wipperfürth to Bergisch Gladbach runs next to Wipperfeld.

Bus routes 
Bus stops Wipperfeld, Wipperfeld, Wende, Wipperfeld, Kirche:
 VRS (KWS) 427 to Bergisch Gladbach (S) via Kürten-Weiden
 VRS (KWS) 426 to Bergisch Gladbach (S) via Kürten

Literature

German 
 Führer, Gerhard: Alarm durch Läuten, Blasen und Trommelschlagen : die Feuerwehren von Olpe und Wipperfeld in früherer Zeit. In: Rhein.-Berg. Kalender 66. 1996 (1995) S. 183-187
 75 Jahre St.-Seb.-Schützenbruderschaft Wipperfeld 1921 e. V. Wipperfeld 1996

External links

German 
 "Unser Wipperfeld"
 Schützenkapelle Wipperfeld
 Wanderwege Wipperfeld
 DJK Wipperfeld
 Informationen über Wipperfeld

Villages in North Rhine-Westphalia
Districts of the Rhine Province